Jiang Tao (born October 1963) is a Chinese engineer who is a professor at Central South University, and an academician of the Chinese Academy of Engineering.

Biography 
Jiang was born in Suixi (now Huaibei), Anhui, in October 1963. After graduating from Central South University in 1990, he stayed at the university and was promoted to professor in 1991. In 2000, he pursued advanced studies at the University of Utah in the United States. He returned to China in December 2002 and continued to teach at Central South University.

Honours and awards 
 18 November 2021 Member of the Chinese Academy of Engineering (CAE)

References 

1963 births
Living people
People from Huaibei
Engineers from Anhui
Central South University alumni
University of Utah alumni
Academic staff of the Central South University
Members of the Chinese Academy of Engineering